Moorevillia is an extinct genus of prehistoric bony fish that lived during the Campanian.

References

Late Cretaceous fish
Tselfatiiformes
Late Cretaceous fish of North America
Mooreville Chalk